John Carlisle may refer to:

 John Griffin Carlisle (1834–1910), United States Representative from Kentucky
 John Carlisle (Australian politician) (1863–1929), member of the Victorian Parliament
 John Nelson Carlisle (1866–1931), secretary of the New York Democratic Party
 John Carlisle (actor) (1935–2011), British actor 
 John Carlisle (British politician) (1942–2019), British Conservative Party Member of Parliament and member of the Conservative Monday Club

See also
 John  Carlile (disambiguation)
 John Carlyle (disambiguation)